Pontechianale is a comune (municipality) in the Province of Cuneo in the Italian region Piedmont, located about  southwest of Turin and about  northwest of Cuneo, on the border with France.

Pontechianale borders the following municipalities: Bellino, Casteldelfino, Crissolo, Oncino (Italy), Molines-en-Queyras, Ristolas, Saint-Paul-sur-Ubaye, and Saint-Véran (France).

References

External links 
 

Cities and towns in Piedmont